John Henry Ward (May 27, 1948 – December 4, 2012) was a National Football League (NFL) center, defensive end and guard who played from 1970 to 1976 for the Minnesota Vikings, the Chicago Bears and the Tampa Bay Buccaneers. He played high school football at Will Rogers High School in Tulsa, Oklahoma, and college football for the Oklahoma State Cowboys and was the Vikings' first round pick in the 1970 NFL Draft. Ward was also a wrestler at Oklahoma State, where he earned NCAA All-American honors in 1969.

Ward died of cancer on December 4, 2012.

References

All-American college football players
American football offensive linemen
American football defensive linemen
Chicago Bears players
Minnesota Vikings players
Oklahoma State Cowboys football players
Tampa Bay Buccaneers players
Sportspeople from Enid, Oklahoma
1948 births
2012 deaths